Siopelus is a genus of beetles in the family Carabidae, containing the following species:

 Siopelus aciculatus (Dejean, 1829) 
 Siopelus aethiopicus (Clarke, 1973) 
 Siopelus alluaudi (Jeannel, 1946) 
 Siopelus alticola Basilewsky, 1950 
 Siopelus amaroides (Basilewsky, 1967) 
 Siopelus andrewesianus (Schauberger, 1934) 
 Siopelus angustatus (Dejean, 1829) 
 Siopelus babaulti (Basilewsky, 1946) 
 Siopelus basilewskyi (Noonan, 1976) 
 Siopelus birmanicus (Bates, 1892) 
 Siopelus brittoni (Basilewsky, 1946) 
 Siopelus bulirschi Facchini, 2002 
 Siopelus bunduki Basilewsky, 1962 
 Siopelus calabaricus Murray, 1859 
 Siopelus calathoides (Dejean, 1829) 
 Siopelus camerunensis (Basilewsky, 1948) 
 Siopelus castaneus (Barker, 1922) 
 Siopelus ceradotus (Basilewsky, 1968) 
 Siopelus collarti Basilewsky, 1948 
 Siopelus connexus (Peringuey, 1896) 
 Siopelus consobrinus (Dejean, 1829) 
 Siopelus crassicornis Burgeon, 1936 
 Siopelus cratericola (Basilewsky, 1962) 
 Siopelus creberrimus (Laferte-Senectere, 1853) 
 Siopelus damarensis (Kuntzen, 1919) 
 Siopelus decorsei (Jeannel, 1948) 
 Siopelus demeyeri Facchini, 2004 
 Siopelus diatypoides Basilewsky, 1946 
 Siopelus exaratus (Klug, 1833) 
 Siopelus fletifer (Dejean, 1829) 
 Siopelus freyi (Basilewsky, 1956) 
 Siopelus fuscus (Dejean, 1829) 
 Siopelus glabripennis (Laferte-Senectere, 1853) 
 Siopelus gracilis (Harold, 1879) 
 Siopelus hargreavesi Basilewsky, 1948 
 Siopelus harpaloides (Guerin-Meneville, 1847) 
 Siopelus hypsinomus (Alluaud, 1917) 
 Siopelus imerinae (Alluaud, 1916) 
 Siopelus iricolor Lorenz, 1998 
 Siopelus iris (Murray, 1859) 
 Siopelus irritans (Basilewsky, 1953) 
 Siopelus jeanneli (Basilewsky, 1948) 
 Siopelus kikuyu (Basilewsky, 1948) 
 Siopelus kilimanus (Alluaud, 1917) 
 Siopelus kivuensis Basilewsky, 1948 
 Siopelus laevicollis N.Ito, 1995 
 Siopelus leleupi Basilewsky, 1976 
 Siopelus lucens (Putzeys in Chaudoir, 1878) 
 Siopelus luteoapicalis (Burgeon, 1936) 
 Siopelus matsumurai (Jedlicka, 1949) 
 Siopelus maynei Burgeon, 1936 
 Siopelus melancholicus (Boheman, 1848) 
 Siopelus micans (Klug, 1833) 
 Siopelus micros (Jeannel, 1948) 
 Siopelus natalicus Peringuey, 1896 
 Siopelus neomaynei Noonan, 1985 
 Siopelus nimbanus (Basilewsky, 1950) 
 Siopelus nyassicus (Basilewsky, 1948) 
 Siopelus oldeanicus (Basilewsky, 1962) 
 Siopelus pallidior (Burgeon, 1936) 
 Siopelus patruelis (Peringuey, 1899) 
 Siopelus pavoninus (Gerstaecker, 1867) 
 Siopelus pediobius (Alluaud, 1926) 
 Siopelus persculptus (Basilewsky, 1968) 
 Siopelus pulchellus (Dejean, 1829) 
 Siopelus punctatellus (Reiche, 1847) 
 Siopelus punctiger (H.Kolbe, 1883) 
 Siopelus punctulatus (Lutshnik, 1922) 
 Siopelus quadraticollis (Putzeys in Chaudoir, 1878) 
 Siopelus radama (Alluaud, 1932) 
 Siopelus resplendens (Putzeys in Chaudoir, 1876) 
 Siopelus rubrosuturatus (Kuntzen, 1919) 
 Siopelus simplex Putzeys in Chaudoir, 1878 
 Siopelus stevensi (Schauberger, 1934) 
 Siopelus tabularis (Basilewsky, 1948) 
 Siopelus tamilnadensis Kataev, 2002
 Siopelus tenuestriatus (Basilewsky, 1948) 
 Siopelus tshibindensis (Burgeon, 1936) 
 Siopelus usambaranus (Basilewsky, 1948) 
 Siopelus venustulus (Boheman, 1848) 
 Siopelus zuzartei A.Serrano, 1999

References

Harpalinae